The  is a Japanese railway line which connects Inarimachi Station in Toyama with Iwakuraji Station in Tateyama,  all within Toyama Prefecture. It is owned and run by Toyama Chihō Railway.

History
The Toyama Light Railway Co. opened the Toyama - Sasazu (since closed) line in 1914. The company merged with the Toyama Electric Railway Co. in 1941, and the Inarimachi - Minami-Toyama section was electrified at 1500 VDC two years later when the current company was formed by a merger of all non-government owned railways in the Toyama area.

Former connecting lines
 Minami-Toyama station - the 12km line to Sasazu on the Takayama Line opened in 1914 and was electrified at 600 VDC in 1943 as it also connected to the Toyama City Tram Line. The line closed in 1975.

Station list
All stations are located within Toyama, Toyama Prefecture

See also
 List of railway lines in Japan

References
This article incorporates material from the corresponding article in the Japanese Wikipedia

Rail transport in Toyama Prefecture
1067 mm gauge railways in Japan